NGC 6229 is a globular cluster located in the constellation Hercules. It is designated as GC(v)B in the galaxy morphological classification scheme and was discovered by the British astronomer William Herschel on 12 May 1787. NGC 6229 is located at about 100,000 light years away from Earth.

It is an intermediate-metallicity globular cluster with two distinct generations of stars, and may be the remnant core of a spheroidal dwarf galaxy.

See also 
 List of NGC objects (6001–7000)

References

External links 
 

6229
Hercules (constellation)
Globular clusters